James Andrew "Jimmy" Evert (September 9, 1923 – August 21, 2015) was an American tennis coach and player. He was the father of Chris Evert, who was one of the world's top women tennis players in the 1970s and 1980s.

Evert was born in Chicago, Illinois.  As a youngster, he was a two-time U.S. age-group champion. He won the 1940 Illinois state high school championship while playing for Senn High School of Chicago.

After serving briefly in the United States Army, he attended the University of Notre Dame on a tennis scholarship, where he majored in economics. In 1947, he won the men's singles title at the Canadian Championships. After retiring as a player, he became a professional tennis coach.

Evert taught all five of his children at the tennis center in Fort Lauderdale, Florida, which was named in his honor in 1997. He also coached Brian Gottfried, Harold Solomon and Jennifer Capriati.

Evert died from pneumonia on August 21, 2015, in Fort Lauderdale. He was 91.

References

External links 
 The Jimmy Evert Tennis Center
 Obituary

American male tennis players
American tennis coaches
Notre Dame Fighting Irish men's tennis players
Tennis players from Chicago
Sportspeople from Fort Lauderdale, Florida
Tennis people from Florida
Tennis people from Illinois
Chris Evert
Military personnel from Illinois
1923 births
2015 deaths
Deaths from pneumonia in Florida
United States Army personnel of World War II
Professional tennis players before the Open Era